Electroluminescence (EL) is an  optical and electrical phenomenon, in which a material emits light in response to the passage of an electric current or to a strong electric field. This is distinct from black body light emission resulting from heat (incandescence), a chemical reaction (chemiluminescence), sound (sonoluminescence), or other mechanical action (mechanoluminescence).

Mechanism

Electroluminescence is the result of radiative recombination of electrons & holes in a material, usually a semiconductor. The excited electrons release their energy as photons - light. Prior to recombination, electrons and holes may be separated either by doping the material to form a p-n junction (in semiconductor electroluminescent devices such as light-emitting diodes) or through excitation by impact of high-energy electrons accelerated by a strong electric field (as with the phosphors in electroluminescent displays).

It has been recently shown that as a solar cell improves its light-to-electricity efficiency (improved open-circuit voltage), it will also improve its electricity-to-light (EL) efficiency.

Examples of electroluminescent materials
Electroluminescent devices are fabricated using either organic or inorganic electroluminescent materials. The active materials are generally semiconductors of wide enough bandwidth to allow the exit of the light.

The most typical inorganic thin-film EL (TFEL) is ZnS:Mn with yellow-orange emission. Examples of the range of EL material include:
 Powdered zinc sulfide doped with copper (producing greenish light) or silver (producing bright blue light)
 Thin-film zinc sulfide doped with manganese (producing orange-red color)
 Naturally blue diamond, which includes a trace of boron that acts as a dopant.
 Semiconductors containing Group III and Group V elements, such as indium phosphide (InP), gallium arsenide (GaAs), and gallium nitride (GaN) (Light-emitting diodes.)
 Certain organic semiconductors, such as [Ru(bpy)3]2+(PF6−)2, where bpy is 2,2'-bipyridine

Practical implementations
The most common electroluminescent (EL) devices are composed of either powder (primarily used in lighting applications) or thin films (for information displays.)

LEC 

Light-emitting capacitor, or LEC, is a term used since at least 1961 to describe electroluminescent panels. General Electric has patents dating to 1938 on flat electroluminescent panels that are still made as night lights and backlights for instrument panel displays. Electroluminescent panels are a capacitor where the dielectric between the outside plates is a phosphor that gives off photons when the capacitor is charged.  By making one of the contacts transparent, the large area exposed emits light.

Electroluminescent automotive instrument panel backlighting, with each gauge pointer also an individual light source, entered production on 1960 Chrysler and Imperial passenger cars, and was continued successfully on several Chrysler vehicles through 1967 and marketed as "Panelescent Lighting".

Night lamps 

Sylvania Lighting Division in Salem and Danvers, MA, produced and marketed an EL night lamp (right), under the trade name Panelescent at roughly the same time that the Chrysler instrument panels entered production. These lamps have proven extremely reliable, with some samples known to be still functional after nearly 50 years of continuous operation. Later in the 1960s, Sylvania's Electronic Systems Division in Needham, MA developed and manufactured several instruments for the Apollo Lunar Lander and Command Module using electroluminescent display panels manufactured by the Electronic Tube Division of Sylvania at Emporium, PA. Raytheon, Sudbury, MA,  manufactured the Apollo guidance computer, which used a Sylvania electroluminescent display panel as part of its display-keyboard interface (DSKY).

Backlight 

Powder phosphor-based electroluminescent panels are frequently used as backlights for liquid crystal displays. They readily provide gentle, even illumination for the entire display while consuming relatively little electric power. This makes them convenient for battery-operated devices such as pagers, wristwatches, and computer-controlled thermostats, and their gentle green-cyan glow is common in the technological world. They require relatively high voltage (between 60 and 600 volts). For battery-operated devices, this voltage must be generated by a converter circuit within the device. This converter often makes an audible whine or siren sound while the backlight is activated. For line-voltage-operated devices, they may be supplied directly from the power line. Electroluminescent nightlights operate in this fashion. Brightness per unit area increases with increased voltage and frequency.

Thin-film phosphor electroluminescence was first commercialized during the 1980s by Sharp Corporation in Japan, Finlux (Oy Lohja Ab) in Finland, and Planar Systems in the US.  In these devices, bright, long-life light emission is achieved in thin-film yellow-emitting manganese-doped zinc sulfide material.  Displays using this technology were manufactured for medical and vehicle applications where ruggedness and wide viewing angles were crucial, and liquid crystal displays were not well developed. In 1992, Timex introduced its Indiglo EL display on some watches.

Recently, blue-, red-, and green-emitting thin film electroluminescent materials that offer the potential for long life and full-color electroluminescent displays have been developed.

In either case, the EL material must be enclosed between two electrodes and at least one electrode must be transparent to allow the escape of the produced light. Glass coated with indium tin oxide is commonly used as the front (transparent) electrode while the back electrode is coated with reflective metal.  Additionally, other transparent conducting materials, such as carbon nanotube coatings or PEDOT can be used as the front electrode.

The display applications are primarily passive (i.e., voltages are driven from the edge of the display cf. driven from a transistor on the display). Similar to LCD trends, there have also been Active Matrix EL (AMEL) displays demonstrated, where the circuitry is added to prolong voltages at each pixel.  The solid-state nature of TFEL allows for a very rugged and high-resolution display fabricated even on silicon substrates.  AMEL displays of 1280×1024 at over 1000 lines per inch (LPI) have been demonstrated by a consortium including Planar Systems.

 
Electroluminescent technologies have low power consumption compared to competing lighting technologies, such as neon or fluorescent lamps. This, together with the thinness of the material, has made EL technology valuable to the advertising industry. Relevant advertising applications include electroluminescent billboards and signs. EL manufacturers can control precisely which areas of an electroluminescent sheet illuminate, and when. This has given advertisers the ability to create more dynamic advertising that is still compatible with traditional advertising spaces.

An EL film is a so-called Lambertian radiator: unlike with neon lamps, filament lamps, or LEDs, the brightness of the surface appears the same from all angles of view; electroluminescent light is not directional and therefore hard to compare with (thermal) light sources measured in lumens or lux. The light emitted from the surface is perfectly homogeneous and is well-perceived by the eye. EL film produces single-frequency (monochromatic) light that has a very narrow bandwidth, is uniform and visible from a great distance.

In principle, EL lamps can be made in any color.  However, the commonly used greenish color closely matches the peak sensitivity of human vision, producing the greatest apparent light output for the least electrical power input.  Unlike neon and fluorescent lamps, EL lamps are not negative resistance devices so no extra circuitry is needed to regulate the amount of current flowing through them. A new technology now being used is based on multispectral phosphors that emit light from 600 to 400nm depending on the drive frequency; this is similar to the color-changing effect seen with aqua EL sheet but on a larger scale.

Electroluminescent lighting is now used as an application for public safety identification involving alphanumeric characters on the roof of vehicles for clear visibility from an aerial perspective.

Electroluminescent lighting, especially electroluminescent wire (EL wire), has also made its way into clothing as many designers have brought this technology to the entertainment and nightlife industry. From 2006, t-shirts with an electroluminescent panel stylized as an audio equalizer, the T-Qualizer, saw a brief period of popularity. 

Engineers have developed an electroluminescent "skin" that can stretch more than six times its original size while still emitting light. This hyper-elastic light-emitting capacitor (HLEC) can endure more than twice the strain of previously tested stretchable displays. It consists of layers of transparent hydrogel electrodes sandwiching an insulating elastomer sheet. The elastomer changes luminance and capacitance when stretched, rolled, and otherwise deformed. In addition to its ability to emit light under a strain of greater than 480% of its original size, the group's HLEC was shown to be capable of being integrated into a soft robotic system. Three six-layer HLEC panels were bound together to form a crawling soft robot, with the top four layers making up the light-up skin and the bottom two the pneumatic actuators. The discovery could lead to significant advances in health care, transportation, electronic communication and other areas.

See also
Electrochemiluminescence
List of light sources
OLED
Photoelectric effect

References

External links
 Overview of electroluminescent display technology, and thediscovery of electroluminescence 
 Chrysler Corporation press release introducing Panelescent (EL) Lighting on 

 8 September, 1959. 

Condensed matter physics
Electrical phenomena
Light sources
Lighting
Luminescence